Tetragonoderus microthorax is a species of beetle in the family Carabidae. It was described by Jian & Tian in 2009.

References

microthorax
Beetles described in 2009